Hakkâri District is the central district of the Hakkâri Province in Turkey. The district had a population of 77,606 people in 2021 with the city of Hakkâri being its seat.

The district was established in 1935.

Settlements 
The main settlement in the district is the city of Hakkâri with Durankaya as the only belde of the district.

Villages and hamlets 
The district has thirty-six villages with moreover 112 hamlets. List of villages:

 Ağaçdibi
 Akbulut
 Akçalı
 Akkuş
 Aksu
 Aşağı Derecik
 Bağışlı
 Bayköy
 Boybeyi
 Cevizdibi
 Ceylanlı
 Çaltıkoru
 Çanaklı
 Çimenli
 Demirtaş
 Doğanyurt
 Elmacık
 Geçimli
 Geçitli
 Işık
 Işıklar
 Kamışlı
 Kavaklı
 Kavalköy
 Kaymaklı
 Kırıkdağ
 Konak
 Oğul
 Olgunlar
 Otluca
 Ördekli
 Pınarca
 Sarıtaş
 Taşbaşı
 Üzümcü
 Yoncalı

References 

Hakkari
Districts of Hakkâri Province
States and territories established in 1935